The Men's lightweight double sculls event at the 2010 South American Games was held over March 19–20. The qualification round and the repechage were held on the first day, beginning at 9:30 and the final was held on the following day at 9:20.

Medalists

Records

Results

Heats

Heat 1

Heat 2

Repechage

Final

References
Heat 1
Heat 2
Repechage
Final

Lightweight Double Scull M